Krisztián Kenesei (born 7 January 1977) is a Hungarian former professional footballer.

Club career 
Kenesei started his career at MTK Hungária, where he played 9 years. He then moved to Győri ETO and Zalaegerszeg, before signed by Beijing Guoan on 25 August 2003. He was offered a 3-year contract at the end of 2003 season. Kenesei was loaned back to Győri ETO in 2005.

In January 2007, he was allowed to sign by Vasas, and on 30 July 2007, he was signed by newly promoted Serie B team Avellino. For the 2008/09 season he will play for Szombathelyi Haladás.

International career
Kenesei played for Hungary but after he returned to China in 2006 he did not receive any call-up. Kenesei played 7 games in UEFA Euro 2004 qualifying.

Honours

Club
MTK Budapest FC
Hungarian League: 1996–97, 1998–99
Hungarian Cup: 1996–97, 1997–98, 1999–00

Zalaegerszeg
Hungarian League: 2001–02

Beijing Guoan
Chinese FA Cup: 2003
Chinese Super Cup: 2003

Individual
Hungarian Top scorer: 2002–03

References

External links 

Krisztián Kenesei profile at magyarfutball.hu
Profile at Sina 
Profile at gazzetta.it 

1977 births
Living people
Footballers from Budapest
Hungarian footballers
Association football forwards
Hungary international footballers
Hungary under-21 international footballers
MTK Budapest FC players
Győri ETO FC players
Zalaegerszegi TE players
Beijing Guoan F.C. players
Vasas SC players
U.S. Avellino 1912 players
Szombathelyi Haladás footballers
Lombard-Pápa TFC footballers
Nemzeti Bajnokság I players
Serie B players
Chinese Super League players
Hungarian expatriate footballers
Expatriate footballers in China
Expatriate footballers in Italy
Hungarian expatriate sportspeople in China
Hungarian expatriate sportspeople in Italy
III. Kerületi TUE footballers
Komáromi FC footballers